Brockelbank is a surname. Notable people with the surname include:

John Edward Brockelbank (1931–2020), Canadian politician, son of John Hewgill
John Hewgill Brockelbank (1897–1977), Canadian politician

See also
Brocklebank (surname)